Epeli Rakai (born circa 1961) is a Fijian former rugby union footballer. He played as hooker.

Career
His first international cap for Fiji was during the match against Solomon Islands, in Apia, on 8 September 1983. He also took part at the 1987 Rugby World Cup, playing two matches
with the quarter-final lost to France being his last international cap. Rakai was also part of the South Pacific Barbarians, a team made up of Fijian, Tongan and Samoan players who played a rebel tour in South Africa, among which were present his teammates who played in Suva, such as Severo Koroduadua, Paulo Nawalu and Sairusi Naituku.

Notes

External links

Fiji international rugby union players
Fijian rugby union players
Rugby union hookers
1961 births
Living people
I-Taukei Fijian people